Bozkurt is a Turkish word and it may refer to:

Surname
Demet Bozkurt (born 1996), Turkish women's footballer
Emine Bozkurt (born 1967), Dutch politician of Turkish descent
Gizem Bozkurt (born 1993), Turkish swimmer
Mahmut Esat Bozkurt Turkish lawyer and politician 
Ümit Bozkurt (born 1976), Turkish footballer
Abdullah Bozkurt (born 1971) Turkish journalist

Places
 Bozkurt, Denizli, district in Denizli Province, Turkey
 Bozkurt, Kastamonu, district in Kastamonu Province, Turkey

Other uses
 Gray wolf, Turkish bozkurt
 Grey Wolves (organization), a Turkish far-right wing organisation

Turkish-language surnames